Qajar Ab-e Olya (also Romanized as Qajar Āb-e ‘Olyā; also known as Qajar Āb) is a village in Kuh Sardeh Rural District, in the Central District of Malayer County, Hamadan Province, Iran. At the 2006 census, its population was 188, in 45 families.

References 

Populated places in Malayer County